State Road 39 (SR 39) in the U.S. state of Indiana is the name of two distinct north–south highways.

Route description

Southern section
Located in south-central Indiana, the shorter southern section of SR 39 begins at SR 56 west of Scottsburg.  It runs north and passes through Little York, then ends at an intersection with SR 250 just before reaching Brownstown.

Northern section
The much longer northern section starts at I-69 and SR 37 in Martinsville, southwest of Indianapolis, and runs north to the Michigan border near I-94 (via M-239). Along the route, it passes through these towns (from south to north):

Martinsville (Southern Terminus, Intersects I-69/SR 37 in Southern Martinsville and SR 67 in Northern Martinsville (Goes under a concurrency with SR 67)
 Monrovia (intersects SR 42)
 Danville (intersects US 36)
 Lizton (interchange with I-74)
 Lebanon (interchange with I-65 exit 139)
 Frankfort (start of US 421 concurrency)
 Rossville (concurrent with US 421)
 Delphi (concurrent with US 421)
 Monticello (end of US 421 concurrency)
 Buffalo (concurrency with SR 16)
 North Judson (concurrency with SR 10)
 LaPorte (concurrency with US 35 and SR 2)
 Springville (intersects US 20)

History

Northern section
In the 1960s, SR 39 was the connector between the west end of I-94 (which ended just north of the Michigan-Indiana border) and the Indiana Toll Road. Hence, a dozen miles of this winding 2-lane road carried all the heavy traffic between Chicago and Detroit.

In 2010, the section of SR 39 between Monrovia and Belleville was greatly improved and re-paved.

Southern section
At one point, SR 39 had a section from US 31 in Henryville to SR 3 in Charlestown. It was later decommissioned when SR 160 was extended to end in Charlestown.

Major intersections

References

External links

Indiana Highway Ends - SR 39

039
Transportation in Boone County, Indiana
Transportation in Carroll County, Indiana
Transportation in Clinton County, Indiana
Transportation in Hendricks County, Indiana
Transportation in Jackson County, Indiana
Transportation in LaPorte County, Indiana
Transportation in Morgan County, Indiana
Transportation in Pulaski County, Indiana
Transportation in Starke County, Indiana
Transportation in Washington County, Indiana
Transportation in White County, Indiana